Dukagjin or Dukagjini may refer to:

 Dukagjin (region), a region in Kosovo
 Dukagjin Highlands, a mountainous region in the Shkodër District of northern Albania
 Principality of Dukagjini, a principality in medieval Albania
 Dukagjini family, an Albanian noble family
 Dukagjin (sq) or Dukagjini, a village in the municipality of Malzi, Kukës District, Albania
 Dukagjin or Dukagjini (sq), a village in the municipality of Derjan, Mat District, Albania